Villa La Zambra is an historical building located in Quinto in the road named Antonio Gramsci which connects Sesto Fiorentino to Florence. Known also as "Villa Bianchini", Zambra has a planimetric development in the shape of a T with a front on via Gramsci 522. The facade culminating with a central gable aedicule is typical of the villas of the early eighteenth century (rococo) and is the result of different renovations realized in different ages starting from an ancient building already registered in the 15th century. The Ginori family bought the property and restore it has a wedding present for the marriage of Giovanni Giuseppe Ginori and Cassandra Ricasoli which took place on 23 September 1721. The property has been notarized by Minister of Culture for its frescoes by the Florentine painter Giovanni Antonio Pucci (1677–1739) who signed (1711) the canvas on the altar of the little private chapel inside the Villa.

The villa is published in "Il Paesaggio Riconosciuto" Edizioni Vangelista Milano 1984 and is cited in various other publications like "The Florentine Villa: Architecture History Society" by Grazia Gobbi Sica.

The property of over 1,300 square meters on two floors, with a large courtyard of over 1500 square meters with driveway access, has been completely restored in the late 1990s and is rented to the Ministry of the Interior of Italy, Department of Public Security, Polizia di Stato.

References

Buildings and structures in Tuscany
Villas in Tuscany